The 2014 Critérium du Dauphiné was the sixty-sixth running of the Critérium du Dauphiné cycling stage race; a race, organised by the Amaury Sport Organisation, rated as a World Tour event on the UCI calendar, the highest classification such an event can have. The Dauphiné was viewed as a great preparation for July's Tour de France and a number of the contenders for the general classification of the Tour participated in the Dauphiné.

Teams
As the Critérium du Dauphiné is a UCI World Tour event, all eighteen UCI ProTeams are invited automatically and obligated to send a squad with three other squads given wildcard places.

Route

Stages

Stage 1
8 June 2014 — Lyon to Lyon, individual time trial (ITT)

The Critérium du Dauphiné began with a  time trial on the streets of Lyon. Chris Froome, the defending champion, won the stage by eight seconds over his arch-rival and fellow GC contender, Alberto Contador. Contador managed to knock Bob Jungels off the hot seat when he beat Jungels' time by one second after Jungels was on the hot seat for a long time. Another main GC contender, Vincenzo Nibali, took the fastest time at the top of the hill to take the lead in the mountains classification. However, he was not able to beat Contador at the finish as he eventually finished eighth on the stage, five seconds behind Contador's time. However, the best performance was left to Froome. Finishing second at the intermediate time-check, Froome eventually beat Contador's time by eight seconds to take the yellow-and-blue jersey for the general classification and the green jersey for the points classification after the first stage.

Stage 2
9 June 2014 — Tarare to Pays d'Olliergues-Col du Béal,

Stage 3
10 June 2014 — Ambert to Le Teil,

Stage 4
11 June 2014 — Montélimar to Gap,

Stage 5
12 June 2014 — Sisteron to La Mure,

Stage 6
13 June 2014 — Grenoble to Poisy,

Stage 7
14 June 2014 — Ville-la-Grand to Finhaut–Emosson (Switzerland),

Stage 8
15 June 2014 — Megève to Courchevel-Le Praz,

Classification leadership

In the 2014 Critérium du Dauphiné, four different jerseys will be awarded. For the general classification, calculated by adding each cyclist's finishing times on each stage, the leader received a yellow jersey with a blue bar. This classification was considered the most important of the 2014 Critérium du Dauphiné, and the winner of the classification was considered the winner of the race.

Additionally, there was a points classification, which awarded a green jersey. In the points classification, cyclists got points for finishing in the top 10 in a stage. For all stages, the win earned 15 points, second place earned 12 points, third 10, fourth 8, fifth 6, and one point fewer per place down to a single point for 10th. Points towards the classification could also be achieved at each of the intermediate sprints; these points were given to the top three riders through the line with 5 points for first, 3 for second, and 1 point for third.

There was also a mountains classification, the leadership of which was marked by a red and white polka-dot jersey. In the mountains classification, points were won by reaching the top of a climb before other cyclists. Each climb was categorised as either hors, first, second, third, or fourth-category, with more points available for the higher-categorised climbs. Hors catégorie climbs awarded the most points, with 20 points on offer for the first rider across the summit; the first ten riders were able to accrue points towards the mountains classification, compared with the first eight on first-category passes and the first six riders on second-category climbs. Fewer points were on offer for the smaller hills, marked as third-category or fourth-category.

The fourth jersey represented the young rider classification, marked by a white jersey. This was decided the same way as the general classification, but only riders born after 1 January 1989 were eligible to be ranked in the classification. There was also a classification for teams, in which the times of the best three cyclists per team on each stage were added together; the leading team at the end of the race was the team with the lowest total time.

Notes
 In stages 2–5, Alberto Contador, who was second in the points classification, wore the green jersey, because Chris Froome (in first place) wore the yellow jersey as leader of the general classification during those stages. In stage 6, Contador still wore the green jersey despite having dropped to third in the points classification. Wilco Kelderman rose to second in the points classification after stage 5, but wore the white jersey as leader of the young rider classification during stage 6.
 In stage 7, Jan Bakelants, who was second in the points classification, wore the green jersey, because Chris Froome (in first place) wore the yellow jersey as leader of the general classification during that stage.

References

Further reading

External links

Critérium du Dauphiné
Criterium du Dauphine
Critérium du Dauphiné
Critérium du Dauphiné
Critérium du Dauphiné